Dearborne is a surname. Notable people with the surname include:

 Bud Dearborne, a fictional character in the True Blood TV-series

See also 
 Dearborn (disambiguation)